is a private university in Tsuyama, Okayama, Japan. The predecessor of the school was founded in 1915. In 1951, it was chartered as a junior college in 1951 and became a women's college in 1967. In 2003 it became a co-ed college.

External links
 Official website 

Educational institutions established in 1915
Private universities and colleges in Japan
Universities and colleges in Okayama Prefecture
1915 establishments in Japan
Tsuyama